Sir Lynden Livingston Macassey KBE KC (1876–1963), was a barrister and labour lawyer.

Biography

Born on 14 June 1876 in Carrickfergus, Larne, County Antrim, Lynden Macassey was the son of the engineer and barrister Luke Livingston Macassey. He was educated at Bedford School and at Trinity College, Dublin.  He was called to the bar in 1899 by the Middle Temple.  Between 1901 and 1909, he lectured in economics and law at the London School of Economics.

During the First World War he became involved in industrial unrest amongst munitions workers on the River Clyde, producing a report with Lord Balfour of Burleigh in 1915. His recommendations were incorporated into the Munitions of War (Amendment) Act 1916.  In 1916, he negotiated agreements for the formation of joint committees of employers and shop stewards on the River Clyde.  However, he was supportive of the controversial deportation from Glasgow of the militant labour leader, David Kirkwood.

In 1922, Macassey became one of the labour assessors for the British government on the Permanent Court of International Justice at The Hague. His seminal work, Labour Policy: False and True, was also published in 1922.

Macassey died in London on 23 February 1963.

Notes

External links
 

1876 births
1963 deaths
People educated at Bedford School
Alumni of Trinity College Dublin
Members of the Middle Temple
British barristers
British King's Counsel
Knights Commander of the Order of the British Empire
Academics of the London School of Economics
Labour lawyers